The Hampton Hammers Football & Netball Club is an Australian rules football and netball club located in the southern suburbs of Melbourne. The club participates in the Southern Football Netball League, based in the south and south eastern suburbs of Melbourne, Victoria.

History
In 1947 a group of young people met at the back of the Hampton Methodist Hall to see if they could form a football Club. Thereby the "Hampton Methodist Football Club" was formed that same year, debuting in the Melbourne Methodist League until it went into recess in 1951.

The club reformed in 1959, joining Eastern Suburban Protestant FA, where they won the C grade premiership. Promoted into B grade the club won the flag in 1961 and were again elevated to A grade.

In 1976 the club changed its name to "Hampton United" and then again in 2000 to just Hampton.

Senior Premierships
 Eastern Suburban Protestant FA/ Eastern Suburban Churches FA (7): 1959, 1961, 1972, 1974, 1978, 1986, 1990
 Southern Football League (2): 2002, 2010

References

External links
 Official website

Australian rules football clubs in Melbourne
Southern Football League (Victoria)
1947 establishments in Australia
Sports clubs established in 1947
Australian rules football clubs established in 1947
Netball teams in Melbourne
Sport in the City of Bayside